Douglas Falkland Carey  DSO was an Anglican priest. A former Army Chaplain who was ordained in 1900, he was Dean of Guernsey from 1922 until 1931.

References

Companions of the Distinguished Service Order
Guernsey Anglicans
Church of England deans
Deans of Guernsey
Year of death missing
Year of birth missing
Royal Army Chaplains' Department officers